Ouani is a town with a population of over 22,000 people. It is located on the island of Anjouan in the Comoros and is the birthplace of writer Coralie Frei and politician Loub Yacout Zaïdou.

See also 
 Ouani Airport

References 

Populated places in Anjouan